Petra is a town and municipality on the Mediterranean island of Majorca, in the Spanish autonomous community of the Balearic Islands. "Petra" means "rock" in Latin.

Petra is the birthplace of St. Junípero Serra (1713-1784), a Franciscan friar who founded the first nine of 21 Spanish missions in California from San Diego to San Francisco.

Notable people
 

Pere Riutort Mestre ( 1935–2021), Majorcan priest, pedagogue, philologue, and liturgist

References

External links

Ajuntament de Petra 
Ajuntament de Petra 

  

Municipalities in Mallorca
Populated places in Mallorca
Junípero Serra